Conor McGrandles (born 24 September 1995) is a Scottish professional footballer who plays as a midfielder for Cambridge United on loan from League One club Charlton Athletic.

Club career

Falkirk
Born in Falkirk, McGrandles is a product of the Falkirk youth academy, moving into the first team at the start of the 2012–13 season. He made his first team début on 29 September 2012, against Cowdenbeath at Central Park, five days after his 17th birthday. His first senior goal came seven weeks later, against Livingston at Almondvale in the 84th minute.

Norwich City
McGrandles was transferred to Norwich City in August 2014. In January 2016, McGrandles returned to Falkirk on loan until the end of the season. On 20 February 2016, McGrandles was stretchered off during Falkirk's 1–0 win at Greenock Morton after suffering a double break in his right leg.

Milton Keynes Dons
McGrandles signed a two-year contract with Milton Keynes Dons in May 2017. On 4 August 2018, during the opening league game of the season away to Oldham Athletic, McGrandles sustained a serious facial fracture resulting in a three-month absence. He made his return to the first team on 13 November 2018, starting in an EFL Trophy group fixture against Brighton & Hove Albion U21s. McGrandles scored his first goal for the club on 16 February 2019, the opening goal in a 3–2 away win over Carlisle United.

Lincoln City
Following the termination of his contract at Milton Keynes Dons, he signed a contract with League One rivals, Lincoln City on the 27 July 2020. He made his debut for Lincoln starting the game in the EFL Cup on 5 September 2020. He would score his first goal for the club at home to Northampton Town on the 23 January 2021. Lincoln offered him a new contract at the end of the 2021-22 season, but it was revealed that he had turned that offer down to explore other options.

Charlton Athletic
On 29 June 2022, McGrandles joined Charlton Athletic on a three-year contract following the expiry of his contract at Lincoln City.

Cambridge United (loan)
On 24 January 2023, McGrandles joined Cambridge United on loan for the rest of the 2022–23 season.

Career statistics

Honours
Milton Keynes Dons
EFL League Two third-place promotion: 2018–19

Individual
Milton Keynes Dons Young Player of the Year: 2018–19

References

External links

Falkirk F.C. players
Scottish Football League players
Footballers from Falkirk
1995 births
Living people
Scottish footballers
Association football midfielders
Scottish Professional Football League players
Norwich City F.C. players
Scotland youth international footballers
English Football League players
Milton Keynes Dons F.C. players
Lincoln City F.C. players
Charlton Athletic F.C. players
Cambridge United F.C. players